The 1954 Ohio Bobcats football team was an American football team that represented Ohio University in the Mid-American Conference (MAC) during the 1954 college football season. In their seventh season under head coach Carroll Widdoes, the Bobcats compiled a 6–3 record (5–2 against MAC opponents), finished in third place in the MAC, and outscored all opponents by a combined total of 175 to 158.  They played their home games in Peden Stadium in Athens, Ohio.

Schedule

References

Ohio
Ohio Bobcats football seasons
Ohio Bobcats football